Hajj-e Saleh-e Lusi (also Romanized as Ḩājj-e Şaleḩ-e Lūsī; also known as Şāleḩ-e Lūsī and Shahīd Dastgheyb) is a village in Hoseynabad Rural District, in the Central District of Shush County, Khuzestan Province, Iran. At the 2006 census, its population was 467, in 59 families.

References 

Populated places in Shush County